Jurupa Valley Valley High School is a public high school in Jurupa Valley, California. The school was established in 1989, as part of the Jurupa Unified School District, and the first class graduated in 1992. Located near the junction of the Ontario (I-15) and Pomona (State Route 60) freeways, it is one of four high schools in the district, the others being Rubidoux High School, Patriot High School, and Nueva Vista High School, a continuation school.

As of the 2014–15 school year, the school had an enrollment of 1,608 students and 65.46 classroom teachers (on an FTE basis), for a student-teacher ratio of 24.56.

Sports
The official school colors of Jurupa Valley High School are navy blue, silver, & white. The Jurupa Valley High School mascot is the jaguar.

Jurupa Valley High School offers sports including male and female football, Waterpolo, soccer, tennis, basketball, girls volleyball and golf.

Most of the sports at JVHS participate in the River Valley League.

The cheer squad of 2004 - 2005 took national champs at the Sharp competition in Hawaii. The squad of 2006 - 2007, took national champs once again. Under the direction of Monica Werwee. The cheer squad also took national champs 3 years in a row at the Sharp competition in Las Vegas, Nevada. (2012-2015) Under the direction of Natalie Franco.

The first winning game was by the Frosh Football team in September 1989 against Elsinore High School.

Garry Gorrel received the Iron Man award in 1990.

Bruce Vanderhorst received the Iron Man award in 1992.

Publications
The JVHS yearbook is a full-color, award-winning annual.

Performing arts
JVHS offers many Performing Arts programs including Choir, Theatre, Band, and Colorguard

The JVHS Choir department consists of five choirs:
 Women's Ensemble (non-audition)
 Show Choir (non-audition)
 Concert Choir
 Treble Choir
 Chamber Singers

The JVHS Theater Department consists of multiple divisions:
 Theater one
 Theater two
 Advanced Theatre
 Stagecraft
Under the direction of Helena Shaer.
As well as an Improv team (by audition only)

The JVHS Marching band and Colorguard also known as Jurupa Valley Silver Brigade and Colorguard consist of:
 Concert band (spring only) 
 Marching band (fall only)
 Colorguard 
 Winterguard (spring only)
Under the Direction of director Michael Alvarez. The marching band competes in the circuit of SCSBOA. The winterguard competed in West Coast Winter Guard and WGI, scoring 2nd place at WCWG championships in 2016.

Notable alumni
Rafael Martin – baseball player
Brian Stokes – baseball player
Raymond McNeil - football player
Brian Parvizshahi - political consultant 
Heather Sten - photographer

See also
List of Riverside County, California, placename etymologies#Jurupa

References

External links
 School Website
 

 http://jurupausd.org/schools/JurupaValleyHighSchool/Pages/Default.aspx

Educational institutions established in 1989
High schools in Riverside County, California
Jurupa Valley, California
Public high schools in California
1989 establishments in California